Falls, a division of Belfast, was a UK parliamentary constituency in Ireland. It returned one Member of Parliament (MP) to the House of Commons of the United Kingdom from 1918 to 1922, using the first past the post electoral system.

Boundaries and Boundary Changes
The constituency was created by the Redistribution of Seats (Ireland) Act 1918 from an area which had been in the Belfast West constituency. It comprised the central third of West Belfast, and contained the then Falls and Smithfield wards of Belfast City Council. The streets in Falls Ward in 1911 are listed 
here and here, and the streets in Smithfield Ward in 1911 are listed here and here.

It was in use at the 1918 general election only, and under the Government of Ireland Act 1920 its area was again part of the Belfast West constituency, with effect at the 1922 general election.

Politics
The constituency was a nationalist area. Joe Devlin defeated Sinn Féin by better than 2 to 1. The Unionists did not contest the seat.

First Dáil
After the 1918 election, Sinn Féin invited all those elected for constituencies in Ireland to sit as TDs in Dáil Éireann rather than in the House of Commons of the United Kingdom. All those elected for Irish constituencies were included in the roll of the Dáil but only those elected for Sinn Féin sat in the First Dáil. In May 1921, the Dáil passed a resolution declaring that elections to the House of Commons of Northern Ireland and the House of Commons of Southern Ireland would be used as the election for the Second Dáil and that the First Dáil would be dissolved on the assembly of the new body. The area of Belfast Falls would then have been represented in the Dáil by the four-seat constituency of Belfast West, which also returned no representatives for Sinn Féin.

Members of Parliament

Election

References

(Information about boundaries of the constituency derived from the map of Northern Ireland Parliament constituencies (in force from 1921) and the wards included in the Belfast UK Parliament seats (in force 1922) for which see Northern Ireland Parliamentary Election Results 1921–1972, by Sydney Elliott (Political Reference Publications 1973) and Boundaries of Parliamentary Constituencies 1885–1972, compiled and edited by F.W.S. Craig (Political Reference Publications 1972) respective

External links
 The Irish General Election of 1918

See also
 List of UK Parliament Constituencies in Ireland and Northern Ireland
 List of MPs elected in the 1918 United Kingdom general election
 Historic Dáil constituencies

Falls
Dáil constituencies in Northern Ireland (historic)
Constituencies of the Parliament of the United Kingdom established in 1918
Constituencies of the Parliament of the United Kingdom disestablished in 1922